Tall al-Shawk, was a Palestinian village in the District of Baysan. It was depopulated by the Israel Defense Forces during the 1947–1948 Civil War in Mandatory Palestine on May 12, 1948, as part of Operation Gideon. It was located five km west of Baysan between the al-Januna'in River to the north and Wadi al-Jawsaq to the south. The village was built above an ancient archeological site and granite columns remain.

History
In 1882 the PEF's Survey of Western Palestine (SWP) described the southern Tell ash Shok as "an artificial earthen mound, with water on either side."

British Mandate era
In the 1922 census of Palestine, conducted by the Mandatory Palestine authorities, Tall al-Shawk had a population of 58 Muslims,
decreasing in the 1931 census to a population of 41 Muslims in 11 houses.

In the  1945 statistics, the village had a population of 120 Muslims, while the total land area was 3,685 dunams. Of this, Arabs used 14 dunums for plantations and irrigable land, 33 for cereals, while 18 dunums were classified as non–cultivable land.

1948 and aftermath
Following the war the area was incorporated into the State of Israel and the village's land was left undeveloped. In 1992, no traces of the village site remained, and the site was covered with weeds and thorns.

References

Bibliography

External links
Welcome To Tall al-Shawk
Tall al-Shawk, Zochrot
Survey of Western Palestine, Map 9: IAA, Wikimedia commons 

Arab villages depopulated during the 1948 Arab–Israeli War